Moso Island is an island off the northwest coast of Efate in Vanuatu, in Shefa Province.

Along with Lelepa, it creates the harbour at north Efate known as Port Havannah.  This harbour was a focal point during World War II, with many troops stationed there, including posts on Moso itself.  Today, small tokens of the soldiers' presence can still be seen on Moso.

History
Seven villages were originally scattered throughout Moso Island until missionaries facilitated their formation into one coastal village, Sunae.  This community was divided in two in the early 1990s and some people split from Sunae, forming Tassirki village on central Moso.

Transport
There are no roads or cars on Moso Island.

Access to the Island is via banana boat from Tanoliu Village in North East Efate.

Once on the Island you can walk anywhere.

Tourism

Tassiriki community, in conjunction with Wan Smolbag Theatre, is the base for a turtle monitoring programme on northwestern Efate.  The project is run throughout Vanuatu with the goal of preserving the endangered turtle species found in the Pacific.  The community operates a bungalow that accommodates volunteers who stay for short-term periods assisting the locals with the turtle monitoring programme.

Sunae community is attempting to initiate a small tour business to the eastern part of the island as part of a community development project.  This part of the island is where parts of Les Aventuriers de Koh-Lanta, the French version of the Survivor TV series, were filmed.

Tranquility Dive and Resort is a commercial business run from the western part of the island and is well known for its dive sites.

Also now a few luxury homes have been developed and are rented to holiday makers, these homes are off the grid and operate via solar power and rain and well water.

Demographics
There are approximately 240 ni-Vanuatu inhabitants on Moso, the majority in Tassirki village.

Economy
Fishing, subsistence agriculture and tourism make up the economy of Moso.  People most frequently fish from the traditional outrigger canoes both during the day and night.

References

Islands of Vanuatu
Shefa Province